Johanna Mikl-Leitner (born 9 February 1964) is an Austrian politician (ÖVP) and since 19 April 2017 the governor of Lower Austria.

Early life and education
Johanna Mikl-Leitner was born in Hollabrunn, Lower Austria. She grew up in Großharras, where she attended primary school from 1970 till 1974. She went to a grammar school which specializes in natural sciences (Realgymnasium) in Laa an der Thaya. In 1978, she switched to business school (Handelsakademie) in Laa, where she took her A-levels (Matura) in 1983. Mikl-Leitner studied Business Education at the Vienna University of Economics and Business and graduated with a Master of Social and Economic Sciences degree.

Career
Mikl-Leitner taught at the business school (Handelsakademie) in Laa an der Thaya, where she had previously studied, from 1989 until 1990. Subsequently she became a trainee with the Federation of Austrian Industries until 1993 and then worked for a publishing company until 1995. At that point she made her first steps into politics. She became the marketing manager for the Lower Austrian ÖVP in 1995 and their leader in 1998.

Politics 
Johanna Mikl-Leitner was a member of Austria's national council from  until , representing the ÖVP. On 24 March 2003, she became a member of the provincial government (Landesrätin) of Lower Austria.

In 2010, she was elected vice president of the Assembly of European Regions. After the resignation of vice chancellor and ÖVP party leader Josef Pröll, the Faymann cabinet was reshuffled and Johanna Mikl-Leitner was sworn in as Austria's minister of the interior on 21 April 2011.

Personal life 
Johanna Mikl-Leitner is married and has two daughters. She lives in Klosterneuburg, Lower Austria.

References

External links 

 Johanna Mikl-Leitner on the official website of the Austrian Parliament

1964 births
Living people
Austrian People's Party politicians
Governors of Lower Austria (after 1918)
Interior ministers of Austria
Members of the National Council (Austria)
People from Hollabrunn
People from Klosterneuburg
Vienna University of Economics and Business alumni
Women government ministers of Austria
Female interior ministers
Women governors of Austrian states
20th-century Austrian women politicians
20th-century Austrian politicians
21st-century Austrian women politicians
21st-century Austrian politicians